Sachem High School North is a public high school in Lake Ronkonkoma, New York, United States. It is a part of the Sachem School District.

Sports 
Sports offered at SHSN:

Boys Bowling
Girls Bowling
Boys Cross Country
Girls Cross Country
Boys Volleyball
Girls Volleyball
Boys Soccer
Girls Soccer
Field Hockey 
Boys Lacrosse
Girls Lacrosse
Football 
Girls Tennis
Boys Tennis
Girls Swimming
Boys Swimming
Boys Basketball
Girls Basketball
Wrestling
Boys Golf
Boys Track
Girls Track
Baseball
Softball
Cheerleading
Arrowettes (dance)

Notable alumni 
 Jon Bellion, singer, rapper, songwriter, & record producer
 Dalton Crossan, NFL running back for the Tampa Bay Buccaneers
 Karen Ferguson-Dayes, soccer player

References

External links
 

Public high schools in New York (state)
Schools in Suffolk County, New York
Educational institutions established in 1955
1955 establishments in New York (state)